Eliezer ("Help/Court of El") was the name of at least three different individuals in the Bible.

Eliezer of Damascus 

Eliezer of Damascus was, according to the Targums, the son of Nimrod. Eliezer was head of the patriarch Abraham's household, as mentioned in the Book of Genesis (15:2).

Medieval biblical exegetes have explained the noun ben mešeq as meaning "butler; steward; overseer", while the name Damméseq Eliʿézer is explained by Targum Onkelos as meaning "Eliezer the Damascene." Others say that he was given the name "Damascus" by Abraham who purchased Eliezer from Nimrod, and had passed through the city of  Damascus while returning with his servant from Babylonia. Other translations of Genesis describe Eliezer as Abraham's heir.

There is an interpretation in Bereshit Rabbah (43:2), cited by Rashi, that Eliezer went alone with Abraham to rescue Lot, with the reference to "his initiates" stated to be 318 in number being the numerical value of Eliezer's name in Hebrew, interpreted in tractate Nedarim (32a) as Abraham not wishing to rely on a miracle by taking only one individual.

The servant of Abraham
According to most interpretations, the unnamed "servant, the elder of [Abraham's] house, that ruled over all that he had," who obtained Rebeccah as a bride for Isaac, was the same Eliezer. This name is first found in the Bible in Genesis 15:2 when Abraham asks God about his promises of a Son while being childless, naming Eliezer being the current heir of his house.

The son of Moses
Eliezer was Moses' and Zipporah's second son. His name means "Help of my God" in Hebrew.

The verse in the Book of Exodus (18:4) states:

Both Gershom and Eliezer were born during the time Moses had taken refuge in Midian and had married Jethro's daughter Zipporah.

Eliezer the prophet
A prophet called Eliezer, son of Dodavah, rebuked King Jehosophat for aligning himself with Ahaziah, the King of Israel. Jehosophat and Ahaziah built ships in Ezion-Geber which were to sail to Tarshish for trade. According to 2 Chronicles (20:37), the ships sank due to his not relying on the Lord:

See also
 Entering heaven alive – regarding Eliezer, the servant of Abraham.

References

9th-century BCE Hebrew people
Book of Genesis people
Book of Exodus people
Nimrod